Ansegisel (c. 602 or 610 – murdered before 679 or 662) was the younger son of Saint Arnulf, bishop of Metz.

Life
He served King Sigebert III of Austrasia (634–656) as domesticus. He was killed sometime before 679, slain in a feud by his enemy Gundewin. Through his son Pepin, Ansegisel's descendants would eventually become Frankish kings and rule over the Carolingian Empire.

Marriage and issue
He was married to Begga, the daughter of Pepin the Elder, sometime after 639. They had the following children: 
 Pepin the Middle (635 or 640 – December 16, 714), who would later become Mayor of the Palace of Austrasia
 Martin of Laon (647 - 680) (though this is disputed)
 Clotilda of Herstal (650–699), married King Theuderic III of Neustria.

References

Sources
 Les ancêtres de Charlemagne, 1989, Christian Settipani

Pippinids
Frankish warriors
Assassinated nobility
7th-century births
7th-century deaths
Year of birth uncertain
Year of death uncertain